Pastor Oropeza Riera (12 October 1901 – 9 July 1991), born in Carora, Lara State, Venezuela, was a renowned pediatrician and one of the most prominent medical personalities in Venezuela. Later on in his life he also occupied certain political positions.

1901 births
1991 deaths
People from Lara (state)
Venezuelan pediatricians
20th-century Venezuelan physicians